Itche Menahem was an Israeli footballer and manager who played and managed in Hapoel Tel Aviv. From 2003 to 2007 he was the president of the Israel Football Association.

Honours
Israeli Premier League (1):
1956-57
Israel State Cup (1):
1961

References

1939 births
2014 deaths
Israeli Jews
Israeli footballers
Israeli football managers
Hapoel Tel Aviv F.C. players
Hapoel Tel Aviv F.C. managers
Footballers from Tel Aviv
Association footballers not categorized by position
Chairmen of the Israel Football Association